Robert James Ball (January 15, 1857 – February 26, 1928) was a Canadian politician, accountant, life insurance agent and teacher. He was elected to the House of Commons of Canada in 1911 as a Member of the Conservative Party to represent the riding of Grey South after being defeated in 1908. He was re-elected in 1917 to Grey Southeast and joined the Unionist Party coalition on March 18, 1918. He was defeated in 1921 by Agnes MacPhail who thus became the first woman elected to the Canadian House of Commons.

Ball was born in Allan Park, Canada West. Prior to his federal political career, he was a town councillor in Hanover, Ontario for three years and reeve for two years.

External links 
 

1857 births
1928 deaths
Conservative Party of Canada (1867–1942) MPs
Members of the House of Commons of Canada from Ontario
Unionist Party (Canada) MPs